Glas–Smurfit Kappa is a professional cycling team, based in Spain, which competes in elite road bicycle racing events such as the UCI Women's Road World Cup in 2015. BZK Emakumeen Bira was the third UCI Women's team competing in 2015 from Spain, for the 2016 season onwards the team stepped down to National level.

Major results
2015
Overall Gipuzkoako Emakumeen Itzulia, Gloria Rodriguez
Prologue, Gloria Rodriguez

2018
Stage 2 Vuelta a Burgos, Isabel Martin

National champions
2015
 Spain Track (Scratch race), María Bonnin
 Spain Track (Team pursuit), Ziortza Isasi

Team history
On September 30, 2014, Olatz Agorria, Aiala Amesti, Maria del Mar Bonnin, Ziortza Isasi, Gloria Rodriguez, Maria San Jose and Eider Unanue. On November 20 the team signed Naia Alzola.

References

UCI Women's Teams
Cycling teams based in Spain
Cycling teams established in 2014